"Drop It Low" is a debut single by Indonesian K-pop girlgroup S.O.S, released digitally to iTunes on February 14, 2013.

Background
On February 11, 2013, S.O.S released their debut EP, Start One Sensation and February 14, 2013, it was announced that the band also released their debut single, "Drop It Low" in 68 countries digitally to iTunes and the music video was aired in Arirang TV.

Composition
The song was written by and composed by Seo Yong-bae. As stated by them: "The single "Drop It Low" is about a girl who stay strong in her brokenhearted. The songs written in 2 different version. Indonesian version and English version.

Music video
A teaser was released on February 7, 2013, and later the music video was released on February 13, 2013. The song which chosen for the music video is the Indonesian version and featured Phantom's member Hanhae.

Promotions
The music video was aired in 68 different countries by Arirang TV.

Track listing

Release history

References

2013 singles
Synth-pop songs
2013 songs
Sony Music singles